This article lists political parties in Liechtenstein. Liechtenstein has a two-party system where the two largest political parties—the Patriotic Union (VU) and the Progressive Citizens' Party (FBP)— dominate politics within the Landtag of Liechtenstein, frequently in coalition. There are currently two minor parties forming the opposition in the Landtag, Democrats for Liechtenstein (DpL) and the Free List (FL), and one minor party not represented in the Landtag, The Independents (DU).

Current Parties

Defunct Parties

See also
 Politics of Liechtenstein
 List of political parties by country

 
Liechtenstein
Political parties
Liechtenstein
Political parties